The 1960 Humboldt State Lumberjacks football team represented Humboldt State College during the 1960 NCAA College Division football season. Humboldt State competed in the Far Western Conference (FWC).

The 1960 Lumberjacks were led by tenth-year head coach Phil Sarboe. They played home games at Albee Stadium in Eureka, California. Humboldt State went undefeated during the regular season, finishing with ten wins and no losses (10–0, 5–0 FWC).

At the end of the season Humboldt State was invited to take part in the NAIA playoffs. In the NAIA championship game, called the Holiday Bowl from 1956 to 1960, they faced the Lenoir–Rhyne Bears in St. Petersburg, Florida. Lenoir–Rhyne prevailed by one point in the game, breaking the Lumberjacks two-season 20 game winning streak. That brought Humboldt State's final record to eleven wins and one loss (11–1, 5–0 FWC). The Lumberjacks outscored their opponents 307–89 for the season. In their eleven wins, Humboldt State outscored their opponents by an average score of 27–7.

Schedule

Team players in the NFL
The following Humboldt State players were selected in the 1961 NFL Draft.

Notes

References

Humboldt State
Humboldt State Lumberjacks football seasons
Northern California Athletic Conference football champion seasons
Humboldt State Lumberjacks football